Francisco Javier Muñoz Llompart (born 5 September 1980), known as Xisco, is a Spanish football manager and former player who played mainly a left winger.

He played 194 matches and scored 20 goals over nine seasons in La Liga, spending four years at Betis, also representing Valencia, Tenerife, Recreativo and Levante and winning the 2004 UEFA Cup with Valencia. Starting in 2011, he played four seasons in Georgia with Dinamo Tbilisi.

In 2019, Xisco rejoined Dinamo Tbilisi as part of the technical team, and in 2020 became the head coach of the club. In December 2020, he was appointed at Watford, achieving promotion to the Premier League in his first season.

Playing career

Valencia
Xisco was born in Manacor, Balearic Islands. He began in the youth ranks of local RCD Mallorca, making ten senior appearances for the B team in Segunda División B in 1998. After two years with Valencia CF's equivalent he moved on loan to Recreativo de Huelva of the Segunda División, scoring ten goals during his first season. He then joined CD Tenerife in 2001–02, before returning (always on loan) to his previous club for the 2002–03 campaign, still in La Liga.

Xisco returned to Valencia in summer 2003 for two additional seasons, making 22 appearances as the Che conquered the 2004 league title; he scored once as a substitute on 2 November 2003 to conclude a 5–0 away win against Mallorca. He added eight matches in their victorious run in the UEFA Cup also in that year, but remained on the bench in the final against Olympique de Marseille.

Betis
Xisco signed with Real Betis in 2005 on a six-year deal, often delivering in various attacking positions and displaying all-around teamwork. He netted three times in 2006–07, including a couple of late goals against Racing de Santander and Gimnàstic de Tarragona as the Andalusians only avoided top-flight relegation in the last matchday.

In a rocky 2008–09 season, which ended in relegation, Xisco only featured in nine games, scoring once. Dark spots included being replaced after having himself been used as a substitute in a 2–1 home defeat to Málaga CF, on 11 January 2009.

Levante and later years
In the dying minutes of the August 2009 transfer window, Xisco rescinded his Betis contract and joined Levante UD also in the second level, for two seasons. In his first he played the most he had in years, also scoring eight goals as the Valencian Community side returned to the top division after a two-year absence.

Xisco contributed 26 matches – 18 starts – in 2010–11, as Levante finally managed to stay afloat. On 22 January 2011 he scored his only goal of the campaign in a 4–1 away loss against Sevilla FC, and was released in May.

Already aged 30, Xisco moved abroad for the first time, signing with FC Dinamo Tbilisi in Georgia and sharing teams with several compatriots. In 2012–13, he won the Erovnuli Liga and also scored a career-best 22 goals, best in the competition. The player and the team retained their titles a year later, and his goal concluded the 3–0 win at FC Sioni Bolnisi that confirmed it.

On 14 December 2014, Xisco returned to his homeland after agreeing to an 18-month deal with third-tier Gimnàstic de Tarragona. On 18 June 2016, he announced his retirement and became Vicente Moreno's assistant. In September of the following year, he stood in as manager of farm team CF Pobla de Mafumet in the Tercera División, after the promotion of Rodri to the Nàstic job.

Coaching career

Dinamo Tbilisi
Xisco returned to Dinamo Tbilisi in January 2019, as part of Zaur Svanadze's staff. He left at the end of the year, after the team had recovered their league crown following a three-year absence.

In August 2020, Xisco again returned to Dinamo, now as head coach of the club. With several compatriots on the pitch and the bench, they won the league in December.

Watford
Xisco was appointed as manager of Watford on 21 December 2020, after the dismissal of Vladimir Ivić. His debut in the EFL Championship was five days later, a 1–0 home victory over leaders Norwich City. 

After a run of five straight wins, Xisco was awarded the Championship Manager of the Month award for March 2021. On 24 April, his team achieved promotion to the Premier League with two games remaining, after a 1–0 win against Millwall at Vicarage Road.

Xisco was sacked on 3 October 2021, despite the side being 15th after seven matches; it was the 13th change in the club's hotseat since the arrival of owner Gino Pozzo in 2012. In an official statement, Watford wrote that the coach had been presiding over a "negative trend at a time when team cohesion should be visibly improving".

Huesca
On 26 October 2021, Xisco signed as coach of SD Huesca. Having finished in 13th in his only season with nine wins out of 30, he was replaced in June by José Ángel Ziganda.

Anorthosis
On 4 October 2022, Xisco was appointed manager of Cypriot First Division club Anorthosis Famagusta F.C. until the end of the season. Three months later, after a series of five winless games, he was replaced by Vesko Mihajlović.

Personal life
Xisco is the older brother of another footballer, Toni Muñoz. He appeared once for Mallorca's first team, but spent the vast majority of his career in the lower leagues of his country.

Career statistics

Managerial statistics

Honours

Player
Valencia
La Liga: 2003–04
UEFA Cup: 2003–04
UEFA Super Cup: 2004

Dinamo Tbilisi
Erovnuli Liga: 2012–13, 2013–14
Georgian Cup: 2012–13, 2013–14
Georgian Super Cup: 2014

Individual
Erovnuli Liga top scorer: 2012–13, 2013–14 
Erovnuli Liga Player of the Year: 2013–14

Manager
Dinamo Tbilisi
Erovnuli Liga: 2020

Individual
Championship Manager of the Month: March 2021

References

External links

1980 births
Living people
Sportspeople from Manacor
Spanish footballers
Footballers from Mallorca
Association football wingers
La Liga players
Segunda División players
Segunda División B players
RCD Mallorca B players
Valencia CF Mestalla footballers
Valencia CF players
Recreativo de Huelva players
CD Tenerife players
Real Betis players
Levante UD footballers
Gimnàstic de Tarragona footballers
Erovnuli Liga players
FC Dinamo Tbilisi players
UEFA Cup winning players
Spain youth international footballers
Spain under-21 international footballers
Spanish expatriate footballers
Expatriate footballers in Georgia (country)
Spanish expatriate sportspeople in Georgia (country)
Spanish football managers
Segunda División managers
Tercera División managers
CF Pobla de Mafumet managers
SD Huesca managers
Erovnuli Liga managers
FC Dinamo Tbilisi managers
Premier League managers
English Football League managers
Watford F.C. managers
Cypriot First Division managers
Anorthosis Famagusta F.C. managers
Expatriate football managers in Georgia (country)
Expatriate football managers in England
Expatriate football managers in Cyprus
Spanish expatriate sportspeople in England
Spanish expatriate sportspeople in Cyprus